Rivière-Nipissis is an unorganized territory in the Côte-Nord region of Quebec, Canada, part of the Sept-Rivières Regional County Municipality.

The eponymous Nipissis River is a left tributary of the Moisie River, with its source north of Lake Siamois. Nipissis, first identified as such in 1892 by surveyor Vincent, comes from the Innu language meaning "small body of water" or "small stream". In previous centuries, the river was also known as Little Saguenay and Moisie River East Branch.

Demographics
As with neighboring communities Lac-Jerome and Petit-Mecatina, Rivière-Nipissis has been completely uninhabited since at least 1991.

See also
 List of unorganized territories in Quebec

References

Unorganized territories in Côte-Nord
Sept-Rivières Regional County Municipality